Raging Speedhorn is the eponymous debut album by the British sludge metal band Raging Speedhorn. Raging Speedhorn features an altogether different sound when compared to the band's later albums, leaning more towards nu metal rather than the sludge metal style featured in later material.

Track listing

Bonus Tracks (UK Enhanced Edition)
The Gush
Thumper (PC-CD ROM music video)

References

2000 albums
Raging Speedhorn albums
Nu metal albums by English artists